The Buffet is the thirteenth studio album by American R&B singer-songwriter R. Kelly. It was released on December 11, 2015, by RCA Records. The album features guest appearances from Lil Wayne, Jhene Aiko, Ty Dolla Sign, Jeremih, Juicy J, Wizkid and Tinashe. The album also marks the debut of Kelly's own daughter, Joann Kelly going by the stage name Ariirayé.

Background 
The album serves as a follow-up to its predecessor Black Panties (2013). In May 2015, he announced that he decided to change the title from White Panties to The Buffet, because "it's just a variety of things" and would contain a mix of different genres of music. Kelly reportedly had written over 462 songs during the development of the album, from which he made his final album selection.

Singles 
"Backyard Party" was released as the albums's first official single on August 21, 2015. The written credits and the serving of its Record production that was handled and provided by R. Kelly. The song peaking at number 6 on the US Adult R&B Airplay.

"Switch Up" was released as the album's second official single on November 6, 2015. The song features guest appearances from an American rapper Lil Wayne and a fellow R&B recording artist Jeremih, with the writing and the production that was handled and provided by R. Kelly himself, along with J-Holt and Cem T.

Promotional singles 
"Marching Band" featuring Juicy J, and "Wake Up Everybody" were released as promotional singles along with the album's pre-order on iTunes.

Critical reception 

Upon its release, The Buffet received mixed reviews from music critics. At Metacritic, which assigns a normalized rating out of 100 to reviews from mainstream critics, the album received an average score of 60, based on 9 reviews, indicating "mixed or average reviews". 

Andy Kellman of AllMusic awarded the album three stars out of five, stating that the album "does have more dimensions than Black Panties" while also pointing out the fact he "remains driven to as ever to take a metaphorical theme to a comedic extreme and then deviate from it in direct and explicit fashion." 

Andy Gill of The Independent gave the album three stars out of five, saying that the album by all accounts is "far from Kelly's best work" while also stating that it's "an OK effort overall." 

Dan Weiss of Spin awarded the album with a seven out of ten, saying that the record is "like the 12 that came before it: hard to enjoy objectively." He also adds that its "better than just another R. Kelly album, but not enough to be worth saying so outside of a review, much less on a year-end list; call it a good one-night stand."

Commercial performance
The album debuted at number 16 on the US Billboard 200 chart, with first-week sales of 39,000 equivalent copies (36,000 in pure album sales). It was the eleventh best-selling album of the week. The Buffet was the thirteenth solo album by Kelly to debut at number one on the Billboard Top R&B/Hip-Hop Albums. In the second week, the album sold 26,000 equivalent copies (25,000 in pure album sales).

HuffPost Live Interview 
Acknowledging the album's lack of record sales, Kelly reached out to his Facebook fans asking for support. In an interview on HuffPost Live, interviewer Caroline Modarressy-Tehrani suggested to Kelly that the lack of sales could be due to listeners feeling conflicted by Kelly's multiple allegations of sexual assault with minors. Kelly refused to answer and walked out of the interview.

Track listing

Personnel
Credits adapted from AllMusic.

R. Kelly – producer, vocals, arranger, mixing 
A.C. – instrumentation, producer, programming
Jhené Aiko – featured artist
Ty Dolla Sign – featured artist
Lil Wayne – featured artist
Jeremih – featured artist
Ariirayé – featured artist
Juicy J – featured artist, vocals
Tinashé – featured artist
Ammo – producer
Angel Onhel Aponte – engineer
Bigg Makk – bass, producer
Cashmere Cat – producer
Jeff Chestek – engineer
Maddox Chhim – assistant
Cirkut – instrumentation, producer, programming
Diana Copeland – executive assistant
Gared Crawford – violin
Samantha Crawford – violin
Antonio Daniels – keyboards
DJ Wayne Williams – A&R
Dr. Luke – instrumentation, producer, programming
Jennifer Eashoo – production coordination
Dernst "D'mile" Emile II – producer
Blake Espy – violin
Rachael Findlen – assistant
Ghislaine Fleischmann – violin
Mike Foster – engineer
Abel Garibaldi – engineer, mixing, programming
Serban Ghenea – mixing
Clint Gibbs – engineer
Larry Gold – conductor, string arrangements
Erwin Gorostiza – creative design

John Hanes – mixing engineer
Samuel Hindes – producer
J Holt – producer
Kash Howard – wardrobe stylist
J Grand – A&R
Jaycen Joshua – mixing
J-MIKE – Instrumentation, producer, programming
Ryan Kaul – assistant
George Kelly – personal assistant
Jonathan Kim – viola
Emma Kummrow – violin
Dave Kutch – mastering
Christian Lantry – photography
Jennie Lorenzo – cello
Donnie Lyle – bass, guitar, musical director, producer, programming
Andre Manuel – producer
Fabian Marasciullo – mixing
Luigi Mazzocchi – violin
McCoy – assistant
Ian Mereness – engineer, mixing, programming
Megan Nimerosky – assistant
Karl Petersen – assistant engineer
Epikh Pro – producer
Irene Richter – production coordination
S1 – producer
John Shullman – assistant
Joan Sullivan – financial director
Cem T – producer
Vern – assistant
Alfonso Walker – keyboards
Keyel Walker – producer
Brian Warfield – engineer

Charts

Weekly charts

Year-end charts

Release history

See also
 List of Billboard number-one R&B/Hip-Hop albums of 2016

References 

2015 albums
R. Kelly albums
Albums produced by R. Kelly
RCA Records albums
Albums produced by Cashmere Cat
Albums produced by Dr. Luke
Albums produced by Cirkut